Firegate is an Indonesian adventure horror film about a mysterious pyramid in Gunung Padang. The film was produced and written by Robert Ronny and directed by Rizal Mantovani.

Cast
 Reza Rahadian as Tomo Gunadi
 Julie Estelle as Arni Kumalasari
 Dwi Sasono as Guntur Samudra
 Ray Sahetapy as Theo Wirawan
 Reza Nangin
 Khiva Iskak
 Ayasha Putri
 Puy Brahmantya

References

External links
 

2016 films
Indonesian horror films
Indonesian action horror films
2010s Indonesian-language films
Films shot in Indonesia